Galactik Football is an animated television series produced by Gaumont Alphanim that mixes conventional 2D animation with 3D computer graphics. It originally aired from 3 June 2006 to 27 October 2011.

In the universe of Galactik Football, the inhabited worlds of the Zaelion Galaxy compete in Galactik Football, a sport analogous to association football, but played seven to a side. The game is complicated by the addition of the Flux, a magical energy which enhances a player's attributes such as speed, strength, and agility, or grants special powers such as teleportation. The story follows the fate of an inexperienced Galactik Football team, the Snow Kids, as they aim to compete in and win the Galactik Football Cup.

Plot

Season 1 
The story begins during a football match between the home team of planet Akillian and the Shadows. As Aarch, captain of the Akillians, takes a direct free kick, an explosion is heard and an avalanche sweeps over the stadium, marking the beginning of the Akillian Ice Age and the loss of The Breath, Akillian's Flux.

The storyline jumps forward 15 years. Aarch and his friend Clamp, a robotic technician, arrive back on Akillian for the first time since the game. Aarch aims to create a new Akillian Galactik Football team capable of winning the Cup, and selects a group of talented teenagers for his team: D'Jok, Sinedd, Micro-Ice, Mei, Thran, Ahito, Rocket, and Tia. However, Rocket's father and Aarch's brother does not want him on the team, and agrees only to let him play on the condition that the newly named Snow Kids win a match against the incumbent Akillian team, the Red Tigers, who are coached by Aarch's estranged old friend and team-mate, Artegor Nexus. During her tryout, Tia reveals that she has the power of the long-lost Breath of Akillian.

The Snow Kids beat the Red Tigers, becoming the new Akillian team. However, an embittered Artegor lures Sinedd away from the Snow Kids and recruits him to the Shadows, whom he has agreed to coach.

As the Snow Kids progress through the competition, each develops the Breath of Akillian. There are some intra-team tensions caused by Tia and Rocket's burgeoning relationship and Micro-Ice's unrequited crush on Mei. Unknown to any of them is that all seven of the players have been affected by the Meta-Flux, a synthetic undetectable Flux, inadvertently created by Clamp and pirate Sonny Blackbones, that was the true origin of the Akillian Ice Age. This Flux is now coveted by the ruthless General Bleylock, who happily endangers the Snow Kids to get his hands on it.

With the help of Clamp and his old partner, the pirate Sonny Blackbones, the Snow Kids escape General Bleylock's machinations and win the Galactik Football Cup.

Season 2 
In season 2, Ahito falls ill and is replaced as goalkeeper by his cousin Yuki. Also, Rocket is suspended from the team due to illegal use of The Breath and is replaced by Mark, another young Akillian footballer, who had previously been considered as a substitute player. In Rocket's absence D'Jok is made captain. After Ahito's recovery he and Yuki share duties as goalkeeper and upon finding in his favour the League allows Rocket to return to the team, which he eventually did. D'Jok remains captain on Rocket's return and leads the team to a second consecutive GFC victory.

Season 3 
A year after their second Galactic Football Cup victory in succession, the mysterious Lord Phoenix invites everyone in the galaxy to a special mixed-flux tournament on the planet Paradisia. After a bad friendly match  against the Shadows, D'Jok and Mei have an argument. Mei dumps D'Jok and joins the Shadows. Yuki leaves the Snow Kids temporarily to join the Elektras, and D'Jok leaves the team after being recruited by Team Paradisia. A Wamba named Lun-Zia joins the Snow Kids for the mixed-flux tournament.
Due to the injection of flux in the core of the Planet Paradisia, Paradisia explodes but luckily everyone was evacuated from the planets with the help of the Galactik Football Players. There is also the Galactik Football Cup which was won by the Snow Kids vs Team Paradisia. This made the Snow kids win the 3 cup.

Disney XD UK aired the first 8 episodes of season 3 in 2010. It was 10 October 2011 before Disney XD was able to air episode 9 of season 3. The remaining episodes have been aired on consecutive days, with the series finale airing on 27 October 2011.

Cast 

 Mario Rosenstock as D'Jok, Barry Rant, Duke Maddox, Baldwin, D'Jado, Akamouk, Zoran, additional voices.
 Michael Fitzgerald as Rocket, Harvey.
 Lara Lenahan as Tia, Addim, Xeeria, Paradisia, additional voices.
 Dominic Catrambone as Micro-Ice.
 Anthony Royer as Micro-Ice.
 Gavin O'Connor as Sinedd, Mark, Sonny Blackbones, Warren, Arty, Woowamboo, Ron Zaera, additional voices.
 Doireann Ní Chorragáin as Mei, Yuki, Kernor, Sunja, Zoelene, Lucille, Olka, Kim.
 Dermot Magennis as Thran, Ahito, Flint Corso, Bennett, Hush Sharky, Doukooba, additional voices.
 Hilary Rose as Lun-Zia, Nina, Nikki, Lun-Zaera, additional voices.
 Jonathan Ryan as Aarch, Harris, Bellow, Ataro, Otis, additional voices.
 Morgan C. Jones as Clamp, Wolfen, additional voices.
 Susan Slott as Dame Simbai, Callie Mystic.
 Malcolm Douglas as Artegor Nexus, Norata, Nork Ag'Net, Brim Balarius, additional voices.
 Roger Gregg as Sydney, General Bleylock, Brim Simbra, Luur, Stevens, Nihla, additional voices.
 Anne Byrne as Maya, Vega, Momice, Stella, additional voices.
 Eoghan O'Riada as Lord Phoenix, Magnus Blade.
 Caitriona Ni Mhurchu as Kyra.
 J. Scott Thompson as additional voices.

Characters 
D'Jok - D'Jok is considered to be the star player of the Snow Kids and plays as the striker. He is dedicated to Galactik Football and tries his best to make sure the Snow Kids wins the Galactik Football Cup. In season 1, D'Jok was brought up by his foster mom Maya, who took him in as her adoptive son upon his biological mother's request before she died. Despite refusing to foretell his future, D'Jok later on finds out that Sonny Blackbones is his father. D'Jok's mother died after giving birth to him and Maya took him under her care. In season 2, D'Jok got to take Rocket's place in the All Star Match, due to his suspension, and became the team captain. In season 3, D'Jok leaves the Snow Kids for Team Paradisia but eventually returns to the team. He also teaches a group of kids how to play football along with the help of Warren and Artegor. Towards the end of season 1, D'Jok and Mei shared a kiss and dated till the beginning of season 3. Mei accused D'Jok to be too controlling and left him for Sinedd. However, D'Jok shares a kiss with Nikki 4 whom Mei sees on the screen caught by a paparazzi and got upset about it. D'Jok is seen to be arrogant and sometimes selfish, but he also has a caring side. He is best friends with Micro-Ice and good friends with Thran, Ahito and Mark too. Subsequently, Sinedd is D'Jok's arch enemy, as both of them compete against each other to see who is the better one. Although, at the end of season 3, they get along with each other. D'Jok cites Warren as his favorite Galactik Football player. D'Jok wears the jersey number 9. He is described to have red spiky hair and green eyes.
Rocket - Rocket is Aarch's nephew and the son of former Galactik Football star Norata. In season 1, Rocket helped his father with his flower company. His father banned him from going to Aarch's tryout. But Rocket eventually goes only to help Tia get to the tryouts. However, Rocket makes it to the Snow Kids as the team captain, as Aarch told Norata that his son could be the next Galactik Football star and has potential. Rocket later finds out, from Tia, that his mother, Kira, is still alive. She pays a visit to him on his 16th birthday, but Rocket gets upset about it as he thought his mother walked out on him and Norata after his birth. However, he forgives his mother when he finds out that his parents reunited for his happiness and to give their relationship a second chance. In season 2, Rocket is suspended by the Galactik Football League due to using his flux (The Breath) outside of the Galactik Football games, but only to save Tia's life. He eventually leaves the team, but goes to play Netherball, which is offered by Sinedd. Despite the Galactik Football League, later in season 2, allowing Rocket back to the Snow Kids, he refuses to come back because he wants to continue to play Netherball. However, Tia beats him and they both quit Netherball, and return to the Snow Kids. In season 3, Rocket becomes the Snow Kids' coach when Aarch leave them for some time. In the series, Rocket develops a relationship with Tia and they eventually date. Rocket is seen to be shy in the beginning of the series. He is seen to be ambitious and intelligent, as he always have strategies to help the Snow Kids win their matches. Rocket is tall and has long brown hair (in season 2 he keeps his hair in a ponytail). He wears the jersey number 5 and plays in midfield.
Tia - Tia is the daughter of the Obia Moon Ambassador. In season 1, she secretly runs away to Akillian in order to try out on Aarch's team. She meets Rocket when her spaceship crashes, and Rocket agrees to take her to the tryouts. However, her parents take her back to Obia Moon as they do not want their daughter to play football, but later agree with her decision. Tia was the first one out of the Snow Kids to already have The Breath. During the Snow Kids' match against the Wombat's Tia gets attacked by Wooamboo, in order to prevent the Snow Kids from winning. In season 2, Tia was about to fall of a cliff but Rocket uses his Breath to save her and he gets suspended. Tia is upset about this and believes it was her fault. She tries her best to bring back Rocket and blames D'Jok for doing nothing. She later beats Rocket in Netherball in hope to bring him back to the Snow Kids, after the Galactik Football League allowing him back to the team. Tia during the GFC tournament leaves the Snow Kids for a while to save her parents in prison with the help from Sonny Blackbones and his team. Yuki had to take her place during the Ryker's match. In season 3, Tia becomes the team captain when D'Jok leaves the team. She also gets jealous of Lun Zia because Tia thinks that she likes Rocket, but later finds out that Lun Zia already has a boyfriend. Tia is seen to be shy and caring. She used to carry a camera with her in season 1. She is in a relationship with Rocket and would do anything for him. Tia in season 1 becomes best friend's with Mei. She even supported Mei in season 3, during her relationship with Sinedd. Tia has blond hair and green eyes. She wears the jersey number 4 and plays in midfield.
Micro-Ice - Micro-Ice is the joker of the team. He is best friends with D'Jok, Thran and Ahito. He also becomes best friends with Mark in season 2, and the two make fun of each other. In season 1, Micro-Ice was not concerned about making it to the Snow Kids, but after the tryouts he gets happy about this. He had a crush on Mei, but gets upset and leaves when he finds out that Mei likes D'Jok. However, Micro-Ice returns to the team, after D'Jok said in an interview that the team is missing Micro-Ice. Micro-Ice was the last one to develop The Breath. He later on also has a crush on a girl named Zoelene. In season 2, Micro-Ice begins to develop a relationship with Yuki. In season 3, they break up because Yuki leaves the Snow Kids for Team Electra. Although, Micro-Ice is seen to reunite with Zoelene. At the end of season 3, Micro-Ice, Mei and a group of kids GF learners (taught by D'Jok) disappear after their training session failed, due to a break out. Micro-Ice is seen to be a chilled back guy and is a good dancer. He also hates Sinedd, but in season 3 begins to get along with him. His mother Mama-Ice works in a café on Akillian. There has been no mention of his father. In season 2 and season 3, Micro-Ice advertises for his drink Mice Delight. Micro-Ice has black hair and silver eyes, and wears the jersey number 3. He plays the striker position.
Mei - In season 1, Mei's mother wanted her to be a supermodel and used her GF career to force her to go into the fashion industry. Mei follows her mother's advice, and she begins to flirt with D'Jok to get Micro-Ice jealous and take his position as a striker. However, she goes back to playing as a defender. But later on, Micro-Ice tells Mei to stand up for herself and she tells her mother that she wants to be a Galactik Football player.
Thran - Thran is Ahito's brother. He is best friends with Micro-ice and D'Jok. Thran is a defender of the Snow Kids. He is one of the few characters that does not seem to have gotten into arguments with anyone due to his likable and cheerful nature. In season 1 he appears to be the smartest Snow Kid and shows interests in technology and gaming. He helps Clamp with his gadgets and can be seen playing games together. Thran also has invented a football with a device that reads the speed in which it is kicked at. He is a great hacker as seen in "The Escape" where he helps Sonny Blackbones and Micro-Ice escape Akillian using blueprints of the ventilation system he had acquired. In season 2 tries to support his brother through the illness that developed. When the illness often affected his brother's strength and skills Thran tried to protect him and helped him hide it. He also spends his time supporting his cousin Yuki as she tries to fit in with the team. In season 3 Thran is still the same cheerfully boy and he is more passionate about new technologies. He was smuggled in a pirate shuttle back on Paradisia with Clamp and helped prevent the ship from exploding in the middle of the Galaxy.
Ahito - Ahito is a goalkeeper for the Snow Kids and twin brother to Thran. Just prior to the beginning of season two, Ahito is struck down by a sudden illness, which caused him to collapse while training. He returns home to Akillian to recuperate, where he is rehabilitated with the help of Dame Simbai. At Thran's suggestion, his cousin Yuki replaces him as goalkeeper. Aarch  During The Homecoming, the rest of the team pays a visit to Akillian and he is able to return to Genesis Stadium with them. His return to play in the second half of the Final 16 match against the Wambas', inspires his flagging team to victory. He continues to play in the quarter and semi-final matches, but has to conceal his illness from his coach and team, even going so far as to make Thran promise not to tell Aarch. During the final of the Galactik Football Cup, the same illness begins to affect Ahito, causing him to make mistakes. Finally, he is forced to admit his illness to Aarch and asks to be removed from play. In season three, it was revealed Ahito has the ability to absorb flux and control it, which was the cause of his illness in season two. After training with Dame Simbai, this saves them when the Breath is lost and he absorbs essence from the Multi-flux and spreads it around the team that allows them to win.
Clamp - Professor Clamp (also once known as Yarrit Labnor) is the technical advisor for the Snow Kids and one of the creators of The Metaflux.
Dame Simbai - Dame Simbai is the medic for Snow Kids and an undercover agent for The Flux Society. She is an old friend of Aarch and acts as a motherly influence to the team and a good mentor, she cares deeply for the players well being.
 Aarch - He is Akillian's former star player and now the founder and coach of the Snow Kids. He is the brother of Norata, uncle of Rocket and the love interest of Galactik Football League President Adium. As a coach, Aarch shows a tough but fair attitude towards his team but is generally kind and admiring of his players talents. He shows no favoritism and tends to make the better choice for the team. He is never usually put down by the attitudes of other people such as Artegor who constantly mocked him in the first season. Aarch usually remains calm in stressful situations however if something appears that could lower the chance of winning, he usually gets stern and shouts but (mostly) for all the right reasons. He also shows a large amount of care for his players wellbeing such as when Rocket disappeared in The Storm and when he left to play Netherball. Akillian's greatest player, Aarch is a footballing legend to the football fans of Planet Akillian. He first started his athletic career in midfield offence as Striker for Planet Akilian and captained the last team to play under the Akillian colours before the Great Ice Age. He was also the last person to use the Breath of Akillian before its disappearance, using the Breath at the moment of the Meta-Flux explosion. The explosion devastated Akillian, causing a huge avalanche to fall upon the stadium. Although not all of the casualties were listed, Norata, Aarch's brother, lost his left leg in the catastrophe. Akillian's axis shifted, bringing about an Ice Age and causing Akillian's flux, The Breath, to vanish. After the onset of the Ice Age Aarch and his best friend Artegor were invited to join team Shadow. He left Akillian to pursue his football career, abandoning girlfriend and fellow player Adium as well as the injured Norata in the process. Among the Shadows the two players absorbed the team's flux and were able to play with the Smog, allowing Aarch to regain and even exceed his previous abilities. However, during a match against Team Cyclops Aarch lost control of the Smog and collapsed. Realizing that the Smog was making him sick and that his life was in danger he decided to leave Team Shadow, an act which caused a rift between himself and Artegor that ended their friendship. He was sent to the Wambas home planet, where he recovered slowly in the care of a medic, Dame Simbai. What he did in the years after his recovery is unknown, but at some point he encountered Professor Clamp, a robotics expert and engineer, who encouraged him to return to Akillian and pursue his dream of reviving the planet Akilian's once great football team. Aarch's arrival on Akillian was met with mixed reactions, especially by those who felt he had abandoned them years before. The younger generation, however were thrilled to meet their sporting hero and many turned up to try out for Aarch's team. From this, Aarch picked a group of seven, which soon increased to eight on the addition of his nephew Rocket. He renovated the old Akillian stadium and turns it into Aarch Academy, where with Professor Clamp as engineer and later Dame Simbai as the team's medic, the Snow Kids were coached.

Club Galactik 
Galactik Football was to have its own virtual world and an internet MMO game called Club Galactik. Development of the game was announced in early 2009 by the show's producer, Alphanim, and MMO game publisher Virtual Fairground. The project went to development hell, briefly went online with a website, and was never fully published after Virtual Fairground went bankrupt in 2011.

Episodes

References

External links
 

Jetix original programming
Disney XD original programming
2000s French animated television series
2010s French animated television series
2006 French television series debuts
2011 French television series endings
2000s science fiction television series
2010s science fiction television series
Animated sports television series
French children's animated action television series
French children's animated space adventure television series
French children's animated science fiction television series
Gaumont Animation
French computer-animated television series
Fictional association football television series
French-language television shows
French sports television series
Anime-influenced Western animated television series
France Télévisions children's television series